Umar Farouk Aliu Mahama (born 27 April 1981) is a Ghanaian politician who is a member of the New Patriotic Party (NPP). He is the member of parliament for the Yendi Constituency after winning in the 2020 parliamentary elections.

Early life and education 
Mahama had his basic education at Sakasaka Presby Experimental School in Tamale and Achimota schools. He attended secondary school at Prempeh College in Kumasi, Ashanti Region. He then went to Ghana Institute of Management and Public Administration (GIMPA) where he completed with a Bachelor of Science degree in marketing.

Mahama also holds a master's degree in Supply Chain Management from the Coventry University in England, the United Kingdom and  he is also certified International Supply Chain Professional which he acquired from the International Purchasing and Supply Chain Management Institute-USA.

Politics 
In June 2020, Mahama won in the primaries and was declared as the New Patriotic Party (NPP) Parliamentary Candidate for the Yendi constituency in the Northern Region ahead of the 2020 parliamentary and presidential elections. Mahama was declared winner after polling 244 votes against Abibata Shanni Mahama Zakaria, a Deputy Chief Executive Officer of the Microfinance and Loans Centre (MASLOC) and Baba Daney, a Chartered Accountant  who got 210 and 139 votes respectively.

In December 2020, he won the 2020 December parliamentary elections for the Yendi Constituency. He was declared winner after getting 40,624 votes against his closest contender Alhassan Abdul Fatawu of the National Democratic Congress (NDC) who had 24,755 votes.

Mahama takes over from Mohammed Habib Tijani, Deputy Minister for Foreign Affairs under the Akufo-Addo government, who had been member of parliament since recapturing the seat for the New Patriotic Party in the 2012 elections but rather decided not to contest in the 2020 elections.

Career 
In August 2021, Nana Akufo-Addo appointed Farouk as the board chair of the Ghana Integrated Iron and Steel Corporation.

Personal life 
He is the son of Ghanaian politician and former vice president the late Aliu Mahama and Hajia Ramatu Mahama. Alhaji Imoro Egala is the maternal grandfather of Farouk

References 

Living people
New Patriotic Party politicians
People from Northern Region (Ghana)
Ghanaian Muslims
Prempeh College alumni
Alumni of Coventry University
Ghana Institute of Management and Public Administration alumni
Ghanaian MPs 2021–2025
1971 births